Catoxantha is a genus of beetles in the family Buprestidae, ranging from northeast India through Southeast Asia. The genus contains the following species:

 Catoxantha bonvouloirii Deyrolle, 1861
 Catoxantha eburnea Janson, 1874
 Catoxantha liouvillei Thery, 1923
 Catoxantha opulenta (Gory, 1832)
 Catoxantha pierrei Descarpentries, 1948
 Catoxantha purpurea (White, 1843)

References

Buprestidae genera